Tontelange is a village of Wallonia and a district of the municipality of Attert, located in the province of Luxembourg, Belgium.

The village is mentioned in written sources in 968 as "Dotlinga". In 1865, it was separated into an municipality of its own, but later merged with several other municipalities into the present municipality of Attert.

References

External links

Former municipalities of Luxembourg (Belgium)